Whetton is a surname. Notable people with the surname include:

Alan Whetton (born 1959), New Zealand rugby union player
Gary Whetton (born 1959), British rugby union player
Jack Whetton (born 1992), New Zealand rugby union player
Jacob Whetton (born 1991), Australian field hockey player
John Whetton (born 1941), British middle-distance runner
John Whetton Ehninger (1827-1889), American painter and etcher
William Whetton (born 1989), New Zealand rugby union player
Penny Whetton (born 1958), Australian climatologist